HSG Blomberg-Lippe is a German women's handball club, that competes in the Handball-Bundesliga Frauen. They play their home matches in Schulzentrum Blomberg, which have capacity for 900 spectators. They play in blue shirts and black shorts.

Kits

Team

Current squad
Squad for the 2022-23 season

Goalkeepers
 16  Melanie Veith
 22  Zoe Ludwig
Wings
RW
 11  Lisa Bormann-Rajes
 20  Emelyn van Wingerden
LW
 31  Alexia Hauf
 34  Mia Ziercke
Pivot
 3  Laura Rüffieux
 29  Stefanie Kaiser

Back players
LB
 8  Lisa Frey
 24  Malina Marie Michalczik
CB
 7  Leni Ruwe	
 9 Nieke Kuehne
 21  Nele Franz
RB
 5  Ann Kynast
 8  Laetitia Quist

Transfers

Transfers for the season 2023–24

 Joining

 Leaving

References

External links
HSG Blomberg-Lippe official website

German handball clubs
Handball clubs established in 1993
1993 establishments in Germany
Lippe
Sport in North Rhine-Westphalia